George A. Buchanan (1842 – October 2, 1864) was an American soldier who received the Medal of Honor for valor during the American Civil War.

Biography
Buchanan enlisted in the Army from Canandaigua, New York in September 1862. He served with the 148th New York Infantry, and was wounded at the Battle of Cold Harbor. He was killed in action on October 2, 1864. He was posthumously awarded the Medal of Honor on April 6, 1865, for his actions at the Battle of Chaffin's Farm.

Medal of Honor citation
Citation:

Took position in advance of the skirmish line and drove the enemy's cannoneers from their guns; was mortally wounded.

See also

List of American Civil War Medal of Honor recipients: A-F

References

External links

Military Times

1842 births
1864 deaths
Union Army soldiers
United States Army Medal of Honor recipients
People of New York (state) in the American Civil War
Union military personnel killed in the American Civil War
People from Victor, New York
American Civil War recipients of the Medal of Honor